Võrevere is a village in Järva Parish, Järva County in central Estonia.

The estimated terrain elevation above sea level is 72 metres. Variant forms of spelling for Võrevere or in other languages: Võrevere Asundus, Vyrevere, Võrevere, Vorevere, Vorevere Asundus, Vyrevere, Võrevere, Võrevere Asundus.

References

 

Villages in Järva County
Kreis Fellin